Tinadendron is a genus of flowering plants belonging to the family Rubiaceae.

Its native range is Southwestern Pacific.

Species:
 Tinadendron kajewskii (Guillaumin) Achille 
 Tinadendron noumeanum (Baill.) Achille

References

Guettardeae
Rubiaceae genera